Jang Woo-jin (born 10 September 1995) is a South Korean table tennis player.

Career

Junior
Jang started playing international matches from the South Korean cadet boys' team in 2009 – Bahrain Junior Open held in Manama, Bahrain. He won boys' singles title at the 2013 World Junior Table Tennis Championships.

2018
He won the gold medal in 2018 Korea Open held at Daejeon, South Korea without even having been a seeded player at the start of the tournament. He became the first-ever ITTF World Tour triple crown winner in this event as well by also winning gold medals in men's doubles and mixed doubles.

2020
In 2020 ITTF Men's World Cup, he was seeded at 12 and managed to reach up to semi-finals. Within a week from this world cup, in 2020 ITTF Finals, he was seeded at 14 and managed to reach semi-finals again.

2021
Jang Woojin represented South Korea at the 2020 Tokyo Olympics after qualifying by virtue of being the highest ranked Korean player. In March, Jang played in the WTT Star Contender event at WTT Doha, but he suffered a disappointing round of 32 exit to Ruwen Filus.

Jang lost 4–3 to Hugo Calderano in the round of 16 in the men's singles event in the Tokyo Olympics.

Singles titles

References

External links

1995 births
Living people
South Korean male table tennis players
Medalists at the 2018 Asian Games
Asian Games silver medalists for South Korea
Table tennis players at the 2018 Asian Games
Asian Games medalists in table tennis
Table tennis players at the 2020 Summer Olympics
World Table Tennis Championships medalists
Olympic table tennis players of South Korea